Westlake Corporation is an international manufacturer and supplier of petrochemicals, polymers and fabricated building products, which are fundamental to various consumer and industrial markets. The company was founded by Ting Tsung Chao in 1986. it is the largest producer of low-density polyethylene (LDPE) in the US and ranks among the Forbes Global 2000. Westlake Chemical operates in two segments: Olefins and Vinyls, and is also an integrated producer of vinyls, with substantial downstream integration into polyvinyl chloride (PVC) building products.

Facilities
In 2014, Westlake made a significant expansion in their ethylene production facilities in Sulphur, Louisiana. In 2014, Westlake acquired the German polyvinyl chloride manufacturer Vinnolit.

In 2016, Westlake acquired U.S. chlor-alkali producer Axiall Corporation for US$3.8 billion.

In June 2021, Westlake purchased the United States building products business of Boral for $2.2 billion

Safety Incidents
In September 2021, an explosion at a Westlake ethylene plant in Sulphur, Louisiana injured 6 workers.  In January 2022, an ethylene dichloride tank exploded at a Westlake facility in Westlake, Louisiana injuring 6 workers and triggering a Shelter-in-place order.

Westlake facilities in Louisiana have had uncontrolled chemical releases including benzene, chloroform, ethylene dichloride, hydrogen chloride and vinyl chloride.

References

External links

Petrochemical companies
Manufacturing companies based in Houston
Companies listed on the New York Stock Exchange